Adelomelon riosi, common name Rios's volute, is a species of sea snail, a marine gastropod mollusk in the family Volutidae, the volutes.

Description
The length of the shell varies between 200 mm and 315 mm.

Distribution
This marine species occurs off the Atlantic coast of South America, from Brazil to Argentina.

References

 Bail, P & Poppe, G. T. 2001. A conchological iconography: a taxonomic introduction of the recent Volutidae. Hackenheim-Conchbook, 30 pp, 5 pl.

External links
 

Volutidae
Gastropods described in 1964